Monique Adamczak (born 21 January 1983) is an Australian professional tennis player. Her favourite surface is grass. She has specialised in doubles and has been coached by Tony Roche, former coach of Roger Federer.

Adamczak made her debut as a professional in 1998, aged 15, at an ITF tournament in Lyneham. On her way to the quarterfinals she defeated Alicia Molik.

She won her first title in September 2000 on grass at the ITF Jaipur in India, defeating home favourite Manisha Malhotra, in three sets. It was here that she also won her first doubles title, partnering with Jennifer Schmidt.

At the 2009 US Open, Adamczak qualified for the singles event, losing to Alizé Cornet in the first round, 6–4, 4–6, 5–7.

At the 2014 Australian Open, Adamczak partnering Olivia Rogowska, reached the third round, losing to the first seeds Sara Errani and Roberta Vinci.

WTA career finals

Doubles: 7 (2 titles, 5 runner-ups)

Performance timeline

Singles

Doubles

WTA 125 tournament finals

Doubles: 1 (runner-up)

ITF Circuit finals

Singles: 19 (8–11)

Doubles: 54 (32–22)

Notes

References

External links
 
 
 

Australian female tennis players
Australian people of Polish descent
People from the Eastern Suburbs (Sydney)
Sportswomen from New South Wales
 

1983 births
Living people
Tennis players from Sydney